Doncaster Rugby Football Club are a rugby union club representing the city of Doncaster, England. The first XV are known as the "Doncaster Knights", and play in the RFU Championship. Being the most promoted side in English history has led to huge changes at the Castle Park ground and within the team structure.

Castle Park Conference and Function centre is a multimillion-pound development and is among the top conference venues in Doncaster, while remaining a supportive place for amateur rugby union in the Borough. The club motto "rugby for all" sees amateur side Doncaster Phoenix compete at the same ground, as well as the ladies side Doncaster Demons and every age group from under-7 to under-17s.

History
The rise to National League One, from amateur status led to the rebranding of Doncaster RFC to Doncaster Knights for the 2006–07 season, and that season saw their highest placed finish to date under Clive Griffiths as Director of Rugby. Doncaster also won the Yorkshire Cup.

After the departure of Griffiths to Worcester, the current DOR Lynn Howells joined the club on the eve of the 2007–08 season. Justin Bishop, signed from London Irish, had acted as DOR during the pre-season.

Howells inspired the Knights to almost repeat the 3rd-place finish in his first season in charge, and has moulded the squad in his own image for the 2008–09 season. 9 January saw the opening of the new De Mulder-Lloyd Stand at Castle park, a £3m state of the art 1650 seater stand. Driven by CEO James Criddle and funded by Tony De Mulder and Steve Lloyd this has seen Castle Park develop into undoubtedly the best rugby facility in South Yorkshire.

The home of the Knights, Castle Park, featured in and won "4 Weddings" and also hosted the Northern BBC TV news coverage for Remembrance Day during 2009 showing how for the operational side of the club has come supporting the on the pitch success.

The 2009–10 season saw the squad decimated by injuries, with no fewer than 15 unavailable players at one stage from a squad of 32. Despite this, and playing nine games in 27 days (of which they won eight) the Knights managed the semi-final of the British and Irish Cup and a promotion play-off finish. The result of the season being the defeat of Bristol at Castle Park, who like Leeds Carnegie before them underestimated the Knights as home.

The 2010–11 and 2011–12 seasons were very average seasons with the Knights managing mid table status and avoiding the relegation playoffs with a reduction in playing budget meaning a shuffling of the pack which saw several long serving players move on to other clubs. The captures of the likes of Tristan Roberts and Paul Devlin hinted at a more creative side than the powerhouse forward game Doncaster are known for traditionally.

The 2012–13 season saw the Knights have a disappointing season with only three wins and a draw out of twenty two league matches and two wins from six in the British and Irish Cup competition which resulted in relegation (for the first time in Doncaster history) back to National League 1.  One of the few highlights being a win over local rivals Leeds Carnegie 23–17 in February 2013.

For the 2013–14 season DOR Clive Griffiths signed a variety of new and returning players including Mat Clark, Paul Jarvis, Bevon Armitage, Roberto Santamaria and Bruno Bravo who would all feature as regulars in the coming season.  The season looked to begin badly for the Knights as they were once again plagued by injuries particularly in the forwards but still with an intention to be the first team to secure promotion back to the Championship at the first time of asking.  The Knights started strongly recording seven straight wins before losing away to Henley Hawks 11–10  in a close fought game.  The Knights campaign continued strongly at home although with away losses to Blaydon and Wharfedale they could not fully pull away from the following pack.  With further signings during the year, such as former British Lion Darren Morris, London Irish back row Danny Kenny, Argentinian-Italian prop Santiago Sodini and the return of former Knight Richard List from RC Narbonne to bolster the injury prone team, the Knights continued to be the team to beat having been top of the table for the majority of the season.

In late March 2014 with only four games left to play of the season there were only two teams (Rosslyn Park & the Knights) left with the potential to win the league and with them due to meet on 29 March many thought this could be the most important match of the season.  The game resulted in a win for Rosslyn Park and meant the Knights would need to win all three of their remaining matches to guarantee promotion.  With a win over Wharfedale (57–17) at home to secure a 100% home win record for the season followed by away wins against Coventry (17–18) & Blackheath (20–38) the Knights secured promotion back to the Championship despite having lost one more game than Rosslyn Park (having achieved more bonus points to be three points clear).

During the 2013–14 season Tyson Lewis was the top try scorer for National League 1 with 22 tries and his teammate Mat Clark was equal second on 20 tries.  Tyson also achieved Guinness World Record fame for "The fastest time to score a try in a rugby union match".  The try was scored direct from the opening kick off in 7.24 seconds (Doncaster Knights vs Old Albanians at Wollam Playing Fields, St Albans, UK, on 23 November 2013).

Honours
Doncaster Knights
Yorkshire Cup winners (4): 1999, 2000, 2007, 2008
 North East 2 Champions: 1992–93
 North East 1 Champions: 1993–94
North Division 2 champions: 1996–97 
North Division 1 champions: 1998–99
National League 3 North champions: 2001–02
National League 1 (formerly National Division 2) champions (2): 2004–05, 2013–14

Doncaster Phoenix (amateur side)
Yorkshire 6 champions: 1999–00
Yorkshire 1 champions: 2014–15
North 1 East champions: 2015–16

Current standings

Current squad

The Doncaster Knights squad for the 2022–23 season.

Past performance

 Season shortened to 20 games due to London Welsh going into liquidation and being removed from the league by the RFU.

References

External links
 Official website

 
English rugby union teams
Rugby clubs established in 1875
Sport in Doncaster